Cookville is an unincorporated community in eastern Titus County, Texas, United States.  It lies along U.S. Route 67 east of the city of Mount Pleasant, the county seat of Titus County.  Its elevation is 433 feet (132 m).  Although Cookville is unincorporated, it has a post office, with the ZIP code of 75558, located at the junction of US 67 and Farm to Market Road 1000.

References

External links

Unincorporated communities in Titus County, Texas
Unincorporated communities in Texas